Luis Quiñones de Benavente or Luis de Benavente y Quiñones (1581 in Toledo – 1651 in Madrid) was a famous Spanish entremesista of the Siglo de Oro.

Works
La maya 
La honrada 
Los gallos 
Los sacristanes burlados 
Los testimonios de los criados 
El sueño del perro 
La noche de San Juan = [Los ]
lang|spa|El miserable y el dotor
Las manos y cuajares 
Las calles de Madrid 
El invierno y el verano 
Los escuderos y el lacayo 
El talego-niño 
El negrito hablador 
El tiempo 
El alcalde del corral
El borracho, 
El barbero 
El burlón 
La verdad 
La puente segoviana I to II 
El tío Bartolomé 
La casa al revés 
El soldado - staged by Tomás Fernández in 1634–5
El mundo - another version of El Soldado 
El mundo al revés - revision of El Soldado first published in Entremeses nuevos Zaragoza 1643.
La visita de la cárcel 
El enfermo 
Las nueces 
Los pareceres 
Don Satisfecho, el moño y la cabellera - written after 1627
Zapatanga 
El botero [= El cuero] 
El mago - co-produced by Tomás Fernández and Pedro de la Rosa in 1637
Los vocablos [= El bigote] 
El Martinillo I & II 
Las cuentas del desengaño 
La paga del mundo 
El poeta de bailes 
La iglesia y el celo

References

1581 births
1651 deaths